Heidalsmuen or Mukampen is a mountain in Sel Municipality in Innlandet county, Norway. The mountain is surrounded by several other notable mountains including Saukampen to the east, Refjellet to the west, and Thokampen and Pillarguritoppen to the northeast.

See also
List of mountains of Norway by height

References

Sel
Mountains of Innlandet